Daniel Nicholaas van Wyk (born 30 March 1986) is a former Namibian rugby union player. Danie was included in the Namibian squad for the 2011 Rugby World Cup. and was named in Namibia's squad for the 2015 Rugby World Cup.

References

1986 births
Living people
Namibian rugby union players
Namibia international rugby union players
Rugby union centres